Andrea Bruschi (born 1 May 1968) is an Italian actor who has appeared in a number of comedy, action, and suspense films, and has also worked as a producer, director, and screenwriter.

He also appeared in an episode of the HBO television series Rome entitled "An Owl in a Thornbush".

Bruschi is an accomplished musician and was once part of the 1980s rock band Bronco Billy, alongside Andrea Linke and Francesco Colella. He created a new wave-dark rock band called Marti. In 2007 the band released its first album Unmade beds, distributed in Italy and Germany.

Acting credits 

I Medici - Masters of Florence (2016)
Shadows in the distance (2013)
Nelle tue mani (2007)
Hermano (2007)
The Nativity Story (2006)
Lavorare con lentezza (2004)
Tre volti del terrore, I (2004)
The Tulse Luper Suitcases, Part 2: Vaux to the Sea (2004)
Pornodrome – Una storia dal vivo (2002)
Vampiro, Il (2002)
Giravolte (2001)
Demonium (2001)
Amici ahrarara (2001)
500! (2001)
Mucca magnetica, La (2000)
Partigiano Johnny, Il (2000)
A Deadly Compromise (2000)
Quando si chiudono gli occhi (2000)
Corti stellari (1997)
Senza piombo (1997)
Dove (1996)
Insert coin (1995)

References

External links

1968 births
Living people
Italian male film actors
Italian screenwriters
Italian musicians
Italian male television actors
20th-century Italian male actors
21st-century Italian male actors
Italian male screenwriters